Local elections were held in Liechtenstein in 1979 to elect the municipal councils and the mayors of the eleven municipalities. Women were able to vote in Vaduz for first time.

Election system
The municipal councils (German: Gemeinderat) are composed of an even number of councillors plus the mayor (German: Gemeindevorsteher). The number of councillors is determined by population count: 6 councillors for population under 500; 8 councillors for population between 500 and 1,500; 10 councillors for population between 1,500 and 3,000; and 12 councillors for population over 3,000.

Councillors were elected in single multi-member districts, consisting of the municipality's territory, using an open list proportional representation system. Voting was on the basis of male suffrage in a secret ballot, except in Vaduz, where women's suffrage was previously introduced.
The mayors were elected in a two-round system. If none of the candidates achieved a majority in the first round, a second round would have been held four weeks later, where the candidate with a plurality would be elected as a mayor.

Results

Overall

Results by municipality

References

1979
Liechtenstein
Local election